State Route 435 (SR 435, OH 435) is a  long east–west state highway in the southwestern portion of the U.S. state of Ohio.

This route follows a former alignment of US 35, which now bypasses this area along a freeway alignment. SR 435 provides access between current U.S. Route 35 and Interstate 71 (I-71), as no direct interchange exists between the two highways.

Route description

The entirety of SR 435 is nestled within the northwestern quadrant of Fayette County.  This highway is not included as a part of the National Highway System (NHS).  The NHS is a network of routes identified as being most important for the economy, mobility and defense of the nation.

SR 435 starts at an incomplete directional T interchange at US 35, and passes through farmland. The route moves southwest and meets the old routing of US 35. SR 435 crosses over I-71 at a diamond interchange, between Allen Road and West Lancaster Road. The route intersects Factory Shops Boulevard, which leads to a shopping center. Then, SR 435 passes over US 35 again, and soon becomes concurrent with SR 729. A mile later, the concurrency ends, and SR 435 ends at SR 729.

History
US 35 between Xenia and Washington Court House was moved onto a new freeway alignment in 2003.  Consequently, the majority of the former two-lane routing was removed from the state highway system.  However, the re-routing resulted in there being no direct connection between US 35 and I-71 at Octa.  To alleviate this, a new connector was built between the freeway just northwest of I-71 and the former routing of US 35.  From this point to the easternmost point of the SR 729 overlap of the previous routing of US 35, the old routing of US 35 was kept in the state highway system.  The connector, along with this portion of former US 35, was assigned the SR 435 designation.  This allowed for not only a connection between I-71 and the new US 35 freeway, but also SR 729 and the freeway.

Northeast Ohio former plans
SR 435 was once a proposed limited-access north–south highway in Portage County and Stark County, as a result of a regional planning report. Connections in Portage would have been at SR 14, SR 59, SR 261, I-76 and US 224. Connections in Stark would have been at SR 619, State Street NE, SR 173, US 62, SR 153, SR 172, US 30 and would have terminated at SR 183 in Sandy. However, the plan was never implemented beyond the planning stages. Instead, the city of Kent and Brimfield Township expanded SR 43 from two lanes to four to provide better access to I-76.

Major intersections

References

435
Transportation in Fayette County, Ohio
U.S. Route 35